Pavel Mojžíš (born October 31, 1977) is a Czech professional ice hockey defenceman who is currently a free agent.

Mojžíš played in the Czech Extraliga for HC Kometa Brno, HC Continental Zlín, HC Havířov Panthers, HC České Budějovice, HC Kladno, HC Znojemští Orli and HC Vítkovice.

References

External links

1977 births
Living people
Motor České Budějovice players
Czech ice hockey defencemen
GKS Tychy (ice hockey) players
LHK Jestřábi Prostějov players
HC Havířov players
SHK Hodonín players
Rytíři Kladno players
HC Kometa Brno players
HC Olomouc players
Orli Znojmo players
KH Sanok players
SK Horácká Slavia Třebíč players
Sportspeople from Zlín
Hokej Šumperk 2003 players
HC Vítkovice players
VHK Vsetín players
PSG Berani Zlín players
Czech expatriate ice hockey people
Czech expatriate sportspeople in Poland
Expatriate ice hockey players in Poland